The 2023 Alsco Uniforms 300 was the 3rd stock car race of the 2023 NASCAR Xfinity Series, and the 27th iteration of the event. The race is scheduled to be held on Saturday, March 4, 2023, in North Las Vegas, Nevada at Las Vegas Motor Speedway, a  permanent tri-oval shaped racetrack. The race took the scheduled 200 laps to complete. Austin Hill, driving for Richard Childress Racing, made a last lap pass on Chandler Smith for the lead, and earned his fourth career NASCAR Xfinity Series win, along with his second of the season. Smith dominated the race in general, leading 118 laps. To fill out the podium, Justin Allgaier, driving for JR Motorsports, and Smith, driving for Kaulig Racing, would finish second and third, respectively.

Background 
Las Vegas Motor Speedway, located in Clark County, Nevada outside the Las Vegas city limits and about 15 miles northeast of the Las Vegas Strip, is a  complex of multiple tracks for motorsports racing. The complex is owned by Speedway Motorsports, Inc., which is headquartered in Charlotte, North Carolina.

Entry list 

 (R) denotes rookie driver.
 (i) denotes driver who is ineligible for series driver points.

Practice 
The first and only practice session was held on Friday, March 3, at 3:30 PM PST, and last for 30 minutes.

Qualifying 
Qualifying was held on Friday, March 3, at 4:00 PM PST. Since Las Vegas Motor Speedway is an intermediate racetrack, the qualifying system used is a single-car, single-lap system with only one round. In that round, whoever sets the fastest time will win the pole.

Race results 
Stage 1 Laps: 45

Stage 2 Laps: 45

Stage 3 Laps: 110

Notes

Standings after the race 

Drivers' Championship standings

Note: Only the first 12 positions are included for the driver standings.

References 

NASCAR races at Las Vegas Motor Speedway
Alsco Uniforms 300 (Las Vegas)
Alsco Uniforms 300 (Las Vegas)